Mauri Tapio Kunnas (born 11 February 1950) is a Finnish cartoonist and children's author.

Kunnas was born in Vammala. He matriculated in 1969 and graduated from the University of Art and Design in Helsinki as a graphic designer in 1975. He has worked as a political cartoonist in many Finnish newspapers. He is currently living in Espoo with his wife Tarja, children Jenna (1983) and Noora (1987) and their cat.

Kunnas is most famous for his numerous children's books, illustrated by himself and featuring anthropomorphic animals. His most famous children's book series is called Koiramäki (Dog Hill), set in historical Finland, featuring anthropomorphic dogs. His other works include Riku, Roope ja Ringo (Ricky, Rocky and Ringo), some "horror" books and books about Joulupukki.

The hordes of clothed animals present in his books by the end of the 1970s led people to compare him to Richard Scarry. But as he became more popular and produced even more work the similarities lessened. Kunnas' children's books usually feature some recurring background characters, like Herra Hakkarainen (Mr. Clutterbuck), a sleepwalking goat.

Aside of children's books, Kunnas has also drawn a rock and roll parody comic called Nyrok City for teenagers and adults. The comic parodies 1970s-1980s era rock and roll culture such as The Beatles and The Rolling Stones in a Finnish style. It is one of the few Kunnas works in which the characters are drawn as humans.

Despite his fame, he remembered his origins. Much of the scenic imagery in his work comes from his hometown of Vammala with glimpses of its churches and rustic atmosphere. He also did valuable PR work for the Finnish home of Santa Claus in Twelve Gifts for Santa Claus (USA 1988), and Santa and the Magic Drum (Otava 1996), the latter of which has also been made into an animated film of the same name in same year.

He recently worked on a grander scale with The Canine Kalevala, a new version of the classic Finnish epic more accessible to children as well as cultural sidestep in his version of The Knights of King Arthur featuring cats in Camelot.

He attributes a large part of his success to his good wife Tarja Kunnas who has worked for twenty years as his assistant doing the painting for her husband's drawings.

In 2014 he won the "Vittoria Samarelli Literary Award" (Castel Goffredo, Italy).

References

External links
 Official site

1950 births
Living people
People from Sastamala
Finnish comic strip cartoonists
Finnish children's writers
Finnish children's book illustrators
Finnish comics artists
Finnish graphic designers
Finnish graphic novelists
Writers who illustrated their own writing